Muireadhach Albanach Ó Dálaigh ("Scottish Muireadhach") was a Gaelic poet and crusader and member of the Ó Dálaigh bardic family.

Early career
The Annals of the Four Masters of Ireland, s.a. 1213, tells us that he was the ollamh (high poet) of Domhnall Ó Domhnaill (died 1241). Muireadhach lived in Lissadell in Cairbre Drom Cliabh, now County Sligo and fled from Ireland after killing King Domhnall's tax-collector Fionn Ó Brolacháin, whom Muireadhach considered had been insolent, with an axe.

In a poem, Ó Dálaigh dismisses his murder as his victim was a mere commoner and therefore of no account, a telling indication of the rigid stratification of traditional Irish society:

Trifling  is our difference with the man,
A shepherd was affronting me;
And I killed that clown;
O God! Is this a cause for enmity?

Career in Scotland
Nevertheless, it was in Scotland that Muireadhach made his name. He served as the court bard to the Mormaer of Lennox. The specific mormaer who patronized him is often thought to have been Ailín II (died  1217), but as the mormaer is called "Mac Muireadhach", son of Muireadhach, it was almost certainly in fact his predecessor and father, Ailín I (died c. 1200). Muireadhach Albanach is important for the cultural history of Scotland because he is the alleged founder of the family of hereditary Scottish bards known to history as the Mac Mhuireadhaich or "MacVurich" family.

The Fifth Crusade
Muireadhach, like his fellow Gaelic poet Gillebrìghde Albanach, went on the Fifth Crusade and travelled to Acre and Damietta (as well as other places, like Rome). In 1228 he was apparently allowed to re-enter Ireland.

Notes

References
 O'Daly, Edmund Emmet, History of the O'Dalys (Tuttle Morehouse & Taylor Publ. Co., New Haven, Conn., USA, 1937)
 Thomson, Professor Derick, The MacMhurich bardic family in Transactions of the Gaelic Society of Inverness 43 (1960–63)
 Gillies, William, A Death-bed poem ascribed to Muireadhach Albanach, Celtica 21 (1990)
 MacQuarrie, Alan, Scotland and the Crusades, (Edinburgh, 1997)
 Clancy, Thomas Owen (ed.), The Triumph Tree: Scotland's Earliest Poetry, 550–1350, (Edinburgh, 1998)
 McLeod, Wilson, Divided Gaels: Gaelic Cultural Identities in Scotland and Ireland, c. 1200-1650, (Oxford, 2004)
Mangan, J.C. (trans.) (1852) The Tribes of Ireland: a Satire. by Aenghus O'Daly, with poetical tr. by J. C. Mangan; together with An historical account of the family of O'Daly; and an introduction to the history of satire in Ireland, by J. O'Donovan, Dublin.

External links
 The Annals of the Four Masters of Ireland, s.a. 1213
 Translation

People from County Sligo
12th-century births
13th-century deaths
Christians of the Fifth Crusade
Irish-language writers
Medieval Irish poets
Scottish literature
13th-century Irish writers
Irish expatriates in Scotland
Irish religious writers
Irish male poets